Richard David Harpin (born 1964) is the founder and CEO of Homeserve, an international home repairs and improvements business.

Early life
Harpin was born in Huddersfield and educated at the Royal Grammar School, Newcastle, before going on to the University of York.

Career 
Harpin joined Procter & Gamble in 1986 to pursue a marketing career. He worked at Procter & Gamble until 1990 before joining Deloitte as a management consultant.

HomeServe 
In 1993 Harpin and Jeremy Middleton established HomeServe as a joint venture with South Staffordshire Water and built it into one of the United Kingdom's largest home emergency businesses. It has since expanded into France in a joint venture with Veolia, the USA and Spain.

In February 2014, HomeServe was fined a record £30.6 million for mis-selling insurance policies and mishandling customer complaints.

In 2017, HomeServe acquired 100% of Checkatrade and in 2019, acquired the Spanish business Habitissimo.

Harpin holds a 7.2% stake in HomeServe, with his wife owning 4.7% shareholding. Their combined stake is worth £440 million.

Investments 
Harpin founded The Enterprise Trust to inspire young people to consider entrepreneurship as a career by creating skills-based apprenticeships and injecting £1 million each year into youth enterprise support.

In 2015 he also founded an investment fund, Growth Partner, that has invested in Crafter's Companion, run by Sara Davies MBE, Iguana Developments and Keelham Farm Shop.

He is a member of the Apprenticeship Ambassadors Network.

In 2013, Harpin and his wife bought their village pub, The Alice Hawthorn Inn in Nun Monkton, to prevent its closure. It won Yorkshire Life magazine's Dining Pub of the Year award in 2017. They also helped revive the Nun Monkton Ferryboat across the River Ouse in 2017 which had been closed since 1952.

Political activity
Harpin is a Conservative Party donor.

Personal life
He is married to Kate and together they have one daughter and two sons. He lives near York and uses a helicopter to commute to work in Walsall.

In 2021, the Sunday Times Rich List estimated his net worth at £627 million.

References

1964 births
English businesspeople
Living people
Alumni of the University of York
Conservative Party (UK) donors